Thiruveer (born 23 July 1988) is an actor and director who works in Telugu theatre and cinema. His notable film appearances include George Reddy (2019),  Palasa 1978 (2020) and Masooda (2022).

Early life 
Thiruveer was born in Mamidipally, Telangana to P. Venkat Reddy and Veeramma. He has done Master of Performing Arts (M.P.A., Theatre Arts) from Potti Sreeramulu Telugu University, Hyderabad. He has also worked as a part-time radio jockey for AIR FM RAINBOW 101.9 Hyderabad in 2012-2013 as RJ Thiru.

Theatre

As an actor 

 Gograhanam
 Barbareekudu
 Kayitham Puli
 Kidinaap (Vijay Tendulkar's missing father)
 Annihilation Of Caste
 New Bharat Cafe (coffee house mein intezaar)
 Kalyani
 Zoo Story
 Antigone
 Kishor Shanthabai Kaale
 Tax Free
 Razakar etc.

As a director 

 Amma Cheppina Katha
 Naa Valla Kaadhu
 Daawat
 A Man With a Lump
 Pushpalatha Navvindhi

Filmography

Television

Honors 
He was felicitated with the J. V. Narasimha Rao young theatre scholar award for the year 2017, from Potti Sreeramulu Telugu University for his contribution to theatre.

References

External links 
 

Indian male film actors
Indian male voice actors
Telugu male actors
Male actors in Telugu cinema
1988 births
Living people
Male actors from Hyderabad, India
21st-century Indian male actors
Male actors from Telangana
Telugu-language dramatists and playwrights
Telugu writers